The Foundation for the Advancement of Mesoamerican Studies, Inc., or FAMSI, is a website used for research in pre-Columbian studies and ancient Mesoamerican cultures. FAMSI was formerly an American not-for-profit grant-making research foundation, established 1993 and based in Crystal River, Florida. It provided research grants and resources to scholars focussing on ancient Mesoamerican cultures, including the Olmec, Maya, Aztec, and others. Grants were available for projects in archaeology, art history, linguistics, ethnography, epigraphy, sociology, and ethnohistory. The non-profit dissolved in 2012, but its research website has remained active under the administration of the Los Angeles County Museum of Art since 2012.

Activities

Funding 
During 19932007, the Foundation granted 3.2 million US dollars to 445 research projects, with a little under two-thirds of these being archaeological, and the remaining third being work in anthropology, art history, and linguistics, in that order. Grants were suspended starting in 2007 'due to unforeseen and unfortunate circumstances.'

Other 
The Foundation maintained an in-house Mesoamerican library of 6,500 volumes, and provided freely-accessible resources via their website, including a Mesoamerican bibliography of 75,000 titles. The Foundation's website, published in 1997, is thought to have been 'the first publicly available website dedicated to the study of ancient Mesoamerica.' All resources, including digital ones, have been housed or maintained by the Los Angeles County Museum of Art since 2012.

Notes

Citations

References 

 
 
 
 
 
 
 
 
 

Mesoamerican studies
1993 establishments in Florida
2012 disestablishments in Florida